Sykes Al Garro (born 26 February 1993) is a Gibraltarian footballer who plays as a forward for Mons Calpe.

Club career
A product of Lions Gibraltar's youth system, Garro began his senior career at the club's feeder team, Lions Pilots. In 2011 he left Gibraltar to study at Northumbria University, although in 2012 he signed a contract at Lions Gibraltar so he remained registered at the club until his return in 2014. He played a total of 36 games over two seasons, helping the side to a 4th place finish in the 2015–16 season. His performances for Lions attracted the attention of regular title challengers Europa, who signed him as one of a number of new Gibraltarian signings to bolster the squad ahead of the new season, in order to comply with new GFA rules on home grown players. He played 15 times (primarily as a substitute), scoring twice, as Europa won the 2016–17 Gibraltar Premier Division. He became a more regular starting feature the following season after the departure of Liam Walker, scoring 3 times in 17 games as Europa finished second in the league. His performances, however, attracted the attention of rivals Lincoln Red Imps, who signed him in June 2018. A year later, he signed for St Joseph's, and made his debut against Scottish giants Rangers on 18 July 2019.

International career
Garro first played internationally for Gibraltar in a development team at the 2015 Island Games. After impressing at Europa, Garro received his first international callup in November 2016. He made his debut for the Gibraltar national football team on 13 November 2016, in a 3–1 loss against Cyprus.

Honours
With Europa
Gibraltar Premier Division: 2016–17
Rock Cup: 2017, 2017–18
Pepe Reyes Cup: 2016
With Lincoln Red Imps
Gibraltar Premier Division: 2018–19

References

Living people
Gibraltarian footballers
Association football forwards
Gibraltar international footballers
Europa F.C. players
Lincoln Red Imps F.C. players
Lions Gibraltar F.C. players
St Joseph's F.C. players
1993 births
Gibraltar Premier Division players